Mapenzi Ya Mungu (God's Love) is a 2014 Tanzanian drama film produced by Elizabeth Michael and directed by Alex Wasponga. It stars Elizabeth Michael, Linah Sanga, and Florah Mtegoha.

Cast
Elizabeth Michael as Shikana 
Linah Sanga as Neema 
Florah Mtegoha
Musa Yusuph as Kitale

Production
The film  was shot in Dar Es Salaam Tanzania by the production company Uwezo Production.

Release
The official trailer for Mapenzi Ya Mungu was released on Proin Promotion YouTube Channel. The film was officially released in October 27, 2014 in DVD and online
The film was screened at the Zanzibar International Film Festival and was nominated to compete for the Zuku Bongo Movies Awards

Awards and nominations

References

2014 drama films
Tanzanian drama films
Films shot in Tanzania
Films set in Tanzania
Nonlinear narrative films